The 1988 Ohio Bobcats football team was an American football team that represented Ohio University in the Mid-American Conference (MAC) during the 1988 NCAA Division I-A football season. In their fourth season under head coach Cleve Bryant, the Bobcats compiled a 4–6–1 record (4–3–1 against MAC opponents), finished in fifth place in the MAC, and were outscored by all opponents by a combined total of 288 to 195.  They played their home games in Peden Stadium in Athens, Ohio.

Schedule

References

Ohio
Ohio Bobcats football seasons
Ohio Bobcats football